Letters to God is a 2010 American Christian drama film directed by David Nixon and starring Robyn Lively, Jeffrey Johnson, Tanner Maguire, Michael Bolten and Bailee Madison. The story was written by Patrick Doughtie about his son Tyler, with the screenplay penned by Doughtie, Art D'Alessandro, Sandra Thrift and Cullen Douglas. The story took place in Nashville, Tennessee, but the movie was filmed in the Orlando, Florida area.

Letters to God is based on the true story of Tyler Doherty, who was played in the film by Tanner Maguire. Parts of the story are real, and others were fictionalized, such as the character of a drunken mailman named Brady McDaniels (Jeffrey Johnson), who receives Tyler's "letters to God". The film was released to theaters on April 9, 2010, with mixed reviews. Despite opening at #10 at the box office, it fell just $92,000 short of its $3 million budget with a final gross of $2.9 million.

Plot 
Tyler Doherty (Tanner Maguire) is an 8-year-old cancer patient with a strong faith in Jesus and a love for writing and sending letters to God. His local postman, Walter Finley (Christopher Schmidt), picked up Tyler's first letter to God. Unsure what to do with it at first, Finley hangs onto it along with Tyler's subsequent God letters. Later, as Finley is about to leave for an extended vacation, he is very worried about who will take over his route, knowing his regulars really rely on him. He hands over Tyler's letters to his boss, Lester (Dennis Neal), making it clear he expects them to be handled with care.

Lester chooses to give Finley's route to Brady McDaniels (Jeffrey Johnson). He is a veteran, an alcoholic, and a regular at a bar where he is close to the bartender, Jack (Tom Nowicki), his former commanding officer. We eventually learn that Brady was arrested for drinking and driving while his young son was in the back seat, resulting in losing custody of his child. Brady becomes terribly depressed and drinks to get his mind off of it. Lester feels strongly that he should be patient with Brady because there is something in him worth saving.

Tyler tries to deal with a bully at school by not reacting to his insults and explaining what it's like to get radiation treatments. The bully, Alex, insults Tyler again so, in defense of her friend, Samantha jumps across the lunch table and pushes Alex's face into a pile of mashed potatoes. All the kids end up at the principal's office. As time goes by, Alex is affected as he sees that Tyler's faith helps him maintain a positive attitude, and it even helps Tyler forgive Alex's bad behavior. The two end up good friends and he starts hanging out with Samantha and Tyler.

On Brady's first day on the route, he is chased by Mrs. Baker's dog, and trips over a sprinkler while running away from the dog, gets tangled in the hose, and drenched. On another day, Tyler arrives home just as Brady finished dropping off the Doherty's mail, and Tyler vomits on Brady's shoes. Brady manages to survive the challenges on the route and starts getting to know Tyler. He becomes inspired by the youngster's unwavering faith and his courage as he faces cancer. a few days later Tyler gets a phone call from his school coach saying if wants to join the soccer game Brady encourages Tyler stating "What's the worst that could happen?" later that day he made the team but as soon as he was going to give his mom a hug he got overworked and passed out being sent to the hospital once again. Feeling ashamed knowing it was a bad idea Brady trashes his apartment in anger he then looks at a picture of his son saying that he is sorry for what he did while holding back his tears. To make himself feel better he reads the letters that Tyler wrote and thinking that he could change his ways for once.

Tyler's illness has reached a point where the decision is made to stop his treatments because they are no longer effective. Continuing would only sap his remaining strength so he will be allowed to live out his days in relative comfort. At an event celebrating Tyler, Brady shares how his life has been impacted by Tyler and that he was led to find faith in God. Tyler later succumbs to his illness and passes away at home. Tyler's best friend, Samantha, dedicates a mailbox for letters to God, saying about Tyler that "his life was a letter to God."

The film closes with a montage showing others of faith who battled and sometimes beat cancer.

Cast 

 Robyn Lively as  Huff Doherty
 Jeffrey Johnson as Brady Jeffrey McDaniels
 Tanner Maguire as Tyler Doherty
 Bailee Madison as Samantha "Sam" Perryfield
 Michael Bolten as Ben  Austin Doherty
 Maree Cheatham as Olivia
 Ralph Waite as Mr. Perryfield
 Brendan Doughtie as Justin McDaniels
 Karley Scott Collins as Ashley Turner

Production 

Pat Doughtie and his dying son, Tyler, became a major story in Nashville, Tennessee when Julie Buchanan was convicted of stealing money from the boy's cancer fund. In caring for his son, Doughtie lost his job and his house, and soon his son died as well. "Once he passed, I decided to write a book," said Doughtie, who was unsure of where telling his son's story would lead. Doughtie took a screenplay class and soon wrote the original script for Letters to God. It was noticed by Christian filmmaker David Nixon, who co-produced Sherwood Pictures' successful Christian films Facing the Giants and Fireproof.

It was assumed that any story involving Tyler would include Julie Buchanan, who stole money from his cancer fund; however, Tyler's true-life cancer is instead fictionalized: an alcoholic mailman intercepts Tyler's letters to God. Doughtie wanted Letters to God to be shot in Nashville, but it was ultimately filmed in Orlando, Florida for financial reasons. David Nixon, Tom Swanson and Kim Dawson are leading a group of investors in the development of three faith-based movies through Possibility Pictures, the first being Letters to God. The film had a production budget of approximately $3 million.

Possibility Pictures 

Possibility Pictures is an Orlando-based Christian film production company, created by David Nixon, Kim Dawson (producer) and Tom Swanson (executive producer). Letters to God is their first production. The company is designed to be the "DreamWorks of faith-based movies."

Release 

Letters to God was released to theaters on April 9, 2010. Nixon said he hoped the film to run in theaters for three to four months, then for it to go to Blu-ray and DVD around July or August 2010. It was released on DVD August 10. The official trailer was released Christmas week, but Christianity Today was given early access to it. The filmmakers said Tim McGraw has agreed to show the movie trailer at 16 of his concerts because he lost a family member to cancer.

Box office 
Letters to God released to theaters on April 9, 2010 in 897 theaters. It debuted #10 at the box office with $1,101,204.00 in its opening weekend. Similar to recent Christian film To Save a Life, Letters to God received strong box office results in smaller markets with a higher concentration of Christian moviegoers, including Charlotte, North Carolina, and Columbus, Ohio. Tracking for the film was highest among families and females. The film dropped 43% in its second weekend, $620,580, accumulating $2,020,830 in two weeks. It closed in June 2010 after grossing $2.85 million, falling just $150,000 short of its budget. Total domestic video sales have amounted to slightly over $6 million.

Reception 
Letters to God received mixed reviews: generally negative from mainstream film critics and far more positive from Christian ones. On Rotten Tomatoes it has a 25% rating based on 24 reviews, with an average rating of 4.70/10. The site's critics consensus reads, "Letters to God's heartwarming real-life story is lost in a heavy-handed drama that's too pat and oppressively earnest to effectively tug the heartstrings." On Metacritic it has a score of 31% based on 7 reviews.

John Beifuss of The Commercial Appeal called the film a "sometimes moving, sometimes awkward blend of sentimental family drama, childhood cancer education and Christian proselytizing". Roger Moore of the Orlando Sentinel gave the film 1½ out of 4 stars, "Letters to God is certainly family-friendly, [but] the blandness robs it of whatever emotion or redemption the filmmakers were shooting for." The NYC Movie Guru gave the film a positive review, "Letters to God manages to be a bighearted, uplifting and captivating drama for all ages. It will inspire you to open your heart compassionately and to find hope, faith and comfort throughout your life’s hardships."

The film was extremely well received by Christian film critics. The Dove Foundation gave the film five stars. Phil Boatwright of the Baptist Press called the film  "A triumph. One of the best films you and your family will see all year." Ted Baehr of Movieguide said, "Letters to God is an impressive movie. It is extremely well written. The dialogue is edgy and drives the story forward. The production quality is first rate. There is even great attention to the music... the type of movie you want everyone to see, one of the most encouraging and inspiring movies in a long time." Plugged In said, "Letters to God actually goes well beyond the tried-and-true tale of a sweet kid who has cancer. It does so by adding the spiritual dimension."

Soundtrack
A CD featuring music from the movie and a song performed by Anne Marie Boskovich was released April 22, 2010. It has currently sold 3,000 copies.

References

External links 
 
 
 
 
 

2010 films
Films about evangelicalism
Films shot in Florida
Films about cancer
2010s English-language films